The 2022–23 Serie D is the seventy-third season of the top level Italian non-professional football championship. It represents the fourth tier in the Italian football league system.

Rules 
The season will provide a total nine promotions to Serie C (those being the winners of all nine groups). Teams placed between second and fifth for each group will play a so-called "playoff tournament", starting with two one-legged games played at the best placed team's home venue:

 2nd-placed team vs 5th-placed team;
 3rd-placed team vs 4th-placed team.

In case of a draw by the end of the game, two extra times will be played; in case of no winner after that, the best-placed team will advance to the final.

The two winning teams will then play a one-legged final, to be hosted at the best placed team's home venue, with the same rules as in the first round. The nine playoff winners for each group will be prioritised to fill any potential Serie C league vacancies.

The two bottom-placed teams for each league group are automatically relegated to Eccellenza. Two two-legged relegation playoff games (known in Italian as "play-out") will therefore be played between:

 13th-placed team vs 16th-placed team (for 18-team groups), or 15th-placed team vs 18th-placed team (for 20-team groups);
 14th-placed team vs 15th-placed team (for 18-team groups), or 16th-placed team vs 17th-placed team (for 20-team groups).

In case of an aggregate draw after the second leg, two extra times will be played; in case of further aggregate draw, the worst-placed team will be relegated.

In case the two teams will have a league gap of at least eight points, the relegation playoff will not take place and the worst-placed team will be automatically relegated instead.

Teams 
The composition of the league involves nine divisions, grouped geographically and named alphabetically.

Teams relegated from Serie C 
The following teams were relegated from the 2021–22 Serie C:
 From Group A: Seregno, Giana Erminio, Legnago;
 From Group B: Pistoiese, Grosseto;
 From Group C: Paganese, Vibonese.

Catania were instead excluded during the season; as per Article 52 of N.O.I.F., a phoenix club from Catania was therefore allowed to submit application to participate in the Serie D league.

Teams promoted from Eccellenza 
The following teams were promoted from Eccellenza:

Abruzzo
 Avezzano
Basilicata
 Matera Grumentum
Apulia
 Barletta
 Martina
Calabria
 Locri
Campania
 Angri
 Palmese
 Puteolana
Emilia Romagna
 Cittadella Vis Modena
 Corticella
 Riccione
 Salsomaggiore
Friuli-Venezia Giulia
 Torviscosa
Lazio
 Lupa Frascati
 Pomezia
 Tivoli

Liguria
 Fezzanese
Lombardy
 Castanese
 Lumezzane
 Sant'Angelo
 Varesina
Marche
 Vigor Senigallia
Molise
 Termoli
Piedmont & Aosta Valley
 Chisola
 Stresa
 Pinerolo
Sardinia
 Ilvamaddalena

Sicily
 Canicattì
 Ragusa
Trentino Alto Adige – Südtirol
 Virtus Bolzano
Tuscany
 Livorno
 Tau Calcio Altopascio
 Terranuova Traiana
Umbria
 Orvietana
Veneto
 Montecchio Maggiore
 Portogruaro
 Villafranca Veronese

 Promoted as national playoff winners.
 Promoted as Coppa Italia Dilettanti runners-up, due to tournament winners Barletta having been promoted directly to Serie D.
 Livorno were readmitted to Serie D after Figline's promotion was revoked due to unsportsmanlike conduct in a promotion playoff game.

Relocations, mergers and renamings
 Cascina relocated to Ponsacco and was renamed Mobilieri Ponsacco.
 Atletico Terme Fiuggi relocated to Riano and was renamed Roma City.
 Muravera relocated to Tertenia and was renamed Sarrabus Ogliastra.
 Stresa merged with Lesa Vergante and was renamed Stresa Vergante.
 Sona changed its name to Chievo-Sona. The renaming was reverted later in September 2022.
 Athletic Carpi changed its name to Carpi.
 FYA Riccione changed its name to United Riccione.

Exclusions
In July 2022, the Serie D football committee announced Rieti and Delta Porto Tolle had not submitted its league application, whereas Lornano Badesse had renounced their right to take part to the season.

Later in August 2022, Giarre were also excluded due to unpaid salaries. Giarre's exclusion was successively suspended by the Administrative Court of Lazio, following an appeal by the club. On 8 September 2022, the Administrative Court of Lazio confirmed the Serie D committee decision about Giarre's exclusion.

Group A

Group B

Group C

Group D

Group E

Group F

Group G

Group H

Group I

Notes

References 

4
Serie D seasons
Italy